Octomarginula is a genus of sea snails or limpets, marine gastropod mollusks in the family Fissurellidae, the keyhole limpets and slit limpets.

Species
Species within the genus Octomarginula include:
Octomarginula arabica (Adams, 1852)
Octomarginula natlandi (Durham, 1950)
 Octomarginula nodulosa (A. Adams, 1852)
Octomarginula ostheimerae (Abbott, 1958)
 Octomarginula sculptilis (A. Adams, 1852)
Octomarginula scutellata (Deshayes, 1863)

References

 McLean J.H. (2011) Reinstatement of the fissurellid subfamily Hemitominae, with the description of new genera, and proposed evolutionary lineage, based on morphological characters of shell and radula (Gastropoda: Vetigastropoda). Malacologia 54(1-2): 407-427. page(s): 413

External links

Fissurellidae